Dry Creek is an unincorporated community in Raleigh County, West Virginia, United States. Dry Creek has a post office with ZIP code 25062.

Climate
The climate in this area has mild differences between highs and lows, and there is adequate rainfall year-round.  According to the Köppen Climate Classification system, Dry Creek has a marine west coast climate, abbreviated "Cfb" on climate maps.

References

Unincorporated communities in Raleigh County, West Virginia
Unincorporated communities in West Virginia